Nagendra Kumar Pradhan is an Indian politician. He is elected to the 16th Lok Sabha in 2014 from Sambalpur constituency in Odisha.
He is a member of the Biju Janata Dal (BJD) political party. He is a former member of Legislative Assembly of Odisha.

Election results

2014

Committee Memberships 

 Committee on Public Undertakings (COPU) - Member 2018

See also
 Indian general election, 2014 (Odisha)

References

Living people
Lok Sabha members from Odisha
India MPs 2014–2019
Members of the Odisha Legislative Assembly
People from Sambalpur district
Year of birth missing (living people)
Janata Dal politicians
Biju Janata Dal politicians